North Ronaldsay (also) is the northernmost island in the Orkney archipelago of Scotland. It is mentioned in the Orkneyinga saga; in modern times it is known for its historic lighthouse, migratory bird life and unusual breed of sheep.

Name
The name comes from the Norse Rinansey, meaning the island of St Ninian. By the 1300s the name was being confused with Rognvaldsey, the island of St Ronald, in the south of Orkney that they were named North Ronaldsay and South Ronaldsay to distinguish them from the other.

Geography
The west of the island is very rocky, with many skerries. North Ronaldsay is low-lying and exposed; its climate is extremely changeable and frequently inclement. The surrounding waters are stormy and treacherous, and have been a notorious "graveyard" for ships (hence the unusually early provision of a lighthouse on the island).

Hollandstoun at the south of the island is the most sizable settlement; it lies roughly equidistant from the airfield and the pier. North Ronaldsay is also home to a bird observatory.

A dry stone dyke has been built to surround the island, the purpose of which is to keep the seaweed-eating local sheep off the arable land.

History

A well-preserved Iron Age broch, known as the Broch of Burrian, is located on the southern tip of the island. Excavations in 1870–71 uncovered a large number of Iron Age and Pictish artefacts, with occupation continuing up to the Norse occupation of the Orkney islands in the 9th century.

According to the Orkneyinga saga, Torf-Einarr, the 10th-century Norse Earl of Orkney, killed Hálfdan Longlegs on North Ronaldsay in revenge for Hálfdan and his brother Gudrød Ljome's slaying of Rögnvald Eysteinsson, Torf-Einarr's father. Hálfdan and Gudrød, who were the sons of King Harald Finehair of Norway, had trapped Rögnvald in his house and set it alight. Harald, apparently appalled by his sons' actions, overthrew Gudrød and restored Rögnvald's lands to his son, Thorir Rögnvaldarson, while Hálfdan fled westwards to Orkney and displaced Torf-Einarr. From a base in Caithness, Torf-Einarr resisted Hálfdan's occupation of the islands. After a battle at sea, and a ruthless campaign on land, Torf-Einarr spied Hálfdan hiding on North Ronaldsay. The sagas claim that Hálfdan was captured, and sacrificed to Odin as a blood-eagle.

The Joseph of King's Lynn was wrecked on Bride's Ness beach in April 1586. The crew salvaged the brass guns but they were confiscated by the Earl of Orkney.

Holland House was built in 1727; the Old Beacon, dating from 1789, was the third lighthouse to be built by Thomas Smith for the Commissioners of the Northern Lights.

Overview of population trends:

Transport
Flights from North Ronaldsay Airport link the island with Kirkwall on the Orkney Mainland, as does a weekly ferry operated by Orkney Ferries. In the summer there are ferries on Tuesdays and Fridays. Flights are subsidized to £36 return, or £21 return for those who stay for at least one night.

Economy

The main industries on the island are crofting and sheep farming, where unique North Ronaldsay sheep are mostly farmed collectively. Tourism also plays an important role.
The island has a population of 60, roughly half of whom are descended from native islanders, and new islanders who have come to live there. There is great interest in attracting new families with young children in order to keep the school open.

Wildlife
The main purpose of the island's bird observatory, established in 1987, is to conduct long-term monitoring of bird populations and migration. North Ronaldsay is well known as one of the best birdwatching sites in the country during the spring and autumn migration periods. The quantity and variety of birds that can be seen at these times is often spectacular.

The great auk (Alca impennis) was a North Atlantic flightless bird about the size of a goose; it became extinct in 1844. North Ronaldsay was one habitat for the great auk which was quite abundant until then. At one Neolithic site, great auk bones make up nearly 14% of bird bones.

North Ronaldsay was also a habitat for the Atlantic walrus through the mid-16th century.

Lighthouse

Old Beacon 

Dennis Head, in the northeast of the island, is home to a historic lighthouse known as the Old Beacon. The light was first established in 1789 by Thomas Smith.  It was to be the first of many island lighthouses for Smith (he had previously worked on the lights at Kinnaird Head and Mull of Kintyre). Smith received assistance with the North Ronaldsay light from his stepson Robert Stevenson, and from Ezekiel Walker.

In 1809, with the construction of other nearby lighthouses, it was decided that the North Ronaldsay light was no longer required, and it was extinguished. The round stone tower was retained as a sea-mark, however, and the original beacon chamber at the top replaced by a vaulted roof, capped by a remarkable ball finial. The stone spiral staircase which once led to the beacon was demolished. The original keepers' houses, roofless but largely complete, survive below the tower. In 2006, it was one of the neglected buildings selected for the TV series Restoration.

Modern lighthouse 

A new lighthouse was built nearby just 43 years later in 1852. The modern lighthouse lies at the north of the island at Point of Sinsoss, and boasts Britain's tallest land-based lighthouse tower. The old fog siren with notable red trumpet was replaced by an electric diaphragm-type horn. That horn was discontinued in favour of a Tyfon horn consisting of 8 mini-trumpets installed on the building that once housed the fog siren. The Tyfon horn gives three blasts every 60 seconds. The electric beeper horn now lies flat on the ground next to the fog signal building. The fog signal is still in service today.

Education
The community has a single school, North Ronaldsay Primary School. It had a single student until July 2017, when its sole student graduated. Various organizations use the school building.

See also

 List of islands of Scotland

Notes

References
 
 
 Pálsson, Hermann and Edwards, Paul Geoffrey (1981). Orkneyinga Saga: The History of the Earls of Orkney. Penguin Classics.

External links

 North Ronaldsay Bird Observatory
 Bird Observatories Council

 
Bird observatories in Scotland
Islands of the Orkney Islands
Orkneyinga saga places
Parishes of Orkney